The R538 is a Regional Route in South Africa. The route begins east of Nelspruit, Mpumalanga and passes through White River to connect with Hazyview.

Route
Its southern terminus N4, between Nelspruit and Kaapmuiden. Heading north-north-west to White River, it enters the town and briefly cosigns with the R40 as it heads north out of it. Just north of the town it leaves the R40 and heads north-east roughly parallel to the latter. Its northern terminus is again an intersection with the R40 in Hazyview.

References

Regional Routes in Mpumalanga